Lübbesee is a lake in Brandenburg, Germany, located in the town of Templin. Its surface area is 3 km².

Lakes of Brandenburg
Uckermark (district)